The Friedrichshafen FF.63 was a German experimental floatplane produced by Flugzeugbau Friedrichshafen.

Development and design
The FF.63 was an experimental monoplane floatplane powered by one Benz Bz.IV. Its first flight took place in August 1918, only shortly before the Armistice that ended all further development. Only one was built.

Specifications

See also

References

Bibliography

Further reading

1910s German experimental aircraft
Floatplanes
FF.63
Single-engined tractor aircraft
Aircraft first flown in 1918